In number theory, a perfect totient number is an integer that is equal to the sum of its iterated totients.  That is, we apply the totient function to a number n, apply it again to the resulting totient, and so on, until the number 1 is reached, and add together the resulting sequence of numbers; if the sum equals n, then n is a perfect totient number. 

The first few perfect totient numbers are
3, 9, 15, 27, 39, 81, 111, 183, 243, 255, 327, 363, 471, 729, 2187, 2199, 3063, 4359, 4375, ... .

In symbols, one writes

for the iterated totient function.  Then if c is the integer such that

one has that n is a perfect totient number if

Multiples and powers of three 

It can be observed that many perfect totient are multiples of 3; in fact, 4375 is the smallest perfect totient number that is not divisible by 3. All powers of 3 are perfect totient numbers, as may be seen by induction using the fact that

Venkataraman (1975) found another family of perfect totient numbers: if  is prime, then 3p is a perfect totient number. The values of k leading to perfect totient numbers in this way are
0, 1, 2, 3, 6, 14, 15, 39, 201, 249, 1005, 1254, 1635, ... .

More generally if p is a prime number greater than 3, and 3p is a perfect totient number, then p ≡ 1 (mod 4) (Mohan and Suryanarayana 1982). Not all p of this form lead to perfect totient numbers; for instance, 51 is not a perfect totient number. Iannucci et al. (2003) showed that if 9p is a perfect totient number then p is a prime of one of three specific forms listed in their paper. It is not known whether there are any perfect totient numbers of the form 3kp where p is prime and k > 3.

References

 

Integer sequences